Sina Sports is a Chinese digital sports media platform that provides live sporting events, highlights, news, discussion forums and other related sports content, primarily targeted at Chinese communities around the world. It is a subsidiary of Chinese internet company Sina.com and was established in 1998 as China's first online sports platform.

The platform operates an online website, mobile website, and mobile app, all of which are only available in the Chinese language.  The mobile is available for iOS and Android devices. The platform also operates multiple verified SINA Weibo accounts including @新浪体育(@SINASports), @新浪体育视频(@SINASportsVideo), and others, collectively garnering over 20 million Weibo followers.

History 
In 1998, Chinese Internet company SRSNet (四通利方) built and operated the official Chinese language online portal for the 1998 FIFA World Cup. Later that year, SRSNet acquired Hua Yuan Online and changed the name to Sina.com, and  the sports platform became known as SINA Sports. From the beginning, Chinese sports fans quickly adopted the platform as a preferred way to access sports around the world. SINA Sports has had the following milestones including:

 Official online website in China for FIFA 1998
 Official online partner in China for the 2000 Sydney Olympics
 Exclusive Internet partner for the Chinese soccer team for FIFA 2002
 Official Internet partner for the Athens 2004 Olympics
 Exclusive Internet partner in China for the 2008 Eurocup
 First to provide live-streaming feed for the 2010 World Cup in South Africa

Programming 
Live Online Broadcasting Rights (Mainland China) as of November 2015:

European Football 
SINA sports holds the live broadcasting rights for UEFA Champions League, AFC Champions League, Premier League, and Bundesliga games.

Domestic Football 
SINA Sports holds the rights to broadcast Chinese Super League games.

Tennis 
SINA Sports broadcasts the WTA Zhuhai, the China Open and International Premier Tennis League.  It is also a partner of the Australian Open.

Golf 
SINA Sports holds the live broadcasting rights for the PGA Tour and the Masters.

Others 
Other rights include MUTV, UFC, NFL, Dakar Rally and the Royal Ascot.

Recent Notable Campaigns 
SINA Sports has developed many partnerships with international athletes.

Guest commentator program 
Sina Sports signed several football personalities including Carlo Ancelotti, Eden Hazard, Gary Neville and Michael Owen to its guest commentator program to provide written columns and video analysis of the latest hot topics around European soccer as well as regular interaction with Chinese fans.

Kobe Bryant commentates NBA Championship live in China 
For game 3 of the 2015 NBA Finals, SINA Sports arranged for Los Angeles Lakers player Kobe Bryant to commentate the game live for Chinese fans, which was streamed on the online and mobile sites. Kobe has his own SINA weibo account, which at the time had 3.5 million followers, sent out three messages during the game which garnered 9,347 comments. Overall, SINA reported 57 million unique views and 74,000 messages related to Kobe's commentating program were recorded on SINA Weibo.

References

External links 

 

Sina Corp
Chinese sport websites
Online companies of China
Internet streaming services
Companies based in Beijing
Chinese brands